Michael John Cardo (born 28 June 1977) is a South African author and politician serving as the Shadow Minister of Employment and Labour since June 2019. He was elected to the National Assembly of South Africa in May 2014. Between June 2015 and June 2019, he was the Shadow Minister of Economic Development. Cardo is a member of the Democratic Alliance.

Early life and education
Cardo was born in 1977 in Durban. He holds a BA Honours in history from the University of Natal. He has an MPhil and a PhD in history from the University of Cambridge. While studying at Cambridge, he attended Trinity College.

Political career
In 2003, Cardo joined the political staff of the Democratic Alliance and worked as a chief of staff in the office of the DA leader Tony Leon. Between 2004 and 2006, he served as the national director of research for the party. During the 2009 general election campaign, Cardo worked as Helen Zille's speechwriter.

He was then employed in the policy and strategy unit of the department of the premier in the Western Cape government between 2011 and 2014.

Parliamentary career
Prior to the 7 May 2014 general election, Cardo was selected as a DA parliamentary candidate. At the election, he won a seat in the National Assembly. He was sworn in as a Member of Parliament on 21 May 2014. Having entered parliament, he was assigned to the Portfolio Committee on Public Service and Administration, Performance Monitoring & Evaluation and the Standing Committee on the Auditor-General in June 2014.

The DA parliamentary leader, Mmusi Maimane, appointed him Shadow Minister of Economic Development on 18 June 2015. He became a member of that specific portfolio's committee on 25 June 2015. On 17 September 2015, he left the public service portfolio committee. He relinquished his membership on the Standing Committee on the Auditor-General on 23 November 2015, meaning that his only committee assignment for the remainder of the term was the Portfolio Committee on Economic Development.

Cardo was re-elected for a second term in May 2019. In June 2019, he became the Shadow Minister of Employment and Labour. He became a member of the Portfolio Committee on Employment and Labour later that month.

Cardo remained in his post as shadow employment and labour minister in John Steenhuisen's Shadow Cabinet.

Personal life
Cardo is one of a number of openly LGBTQ+ members of parliament.

Cardo was awarded a Visiting Research Fellowship at the Helen Suzman Foundation in 2006.

Publications
Cardo, Michael (2010). Opening Men's Eyes: Peter Brown And The Liberal Struggle For South Africa.

References

External links
Dr Michael John Cardo at Parliament of South Africa

Living people
1977 births
People from Durban
People from KwaZulu-Natal
White South African people
University of Natal alumni
Alumni of the University of Cambridge
Members of the National Assembly of South Africa
Democratic Alliance (South Africa) politicians
21st-century South African politicians
South African writers
South African LGBT politicians